The Oroville Carnegie Library, at 1675 Montgomery St. in Oroville, California, was built in 1912.  It was listed on the National Register of Historic Places in 2007.

It is a two-story Carnegie library designed by architect William Henry Weeks in Classical Revival style.

It is now the Butte County Public Law Library

References

External links

Carnegie libraries in California
National Register of Historic Places in Butte County, California
Neoclassical architecture in California
Library buildings completed in 1912